Operation Chaffinch was a World War II mission conducted by a branch of the British Special Operations Executive (SOE), Company Linge, a Norwegian group. The operation aimed to make contact with local resistance groups in the Oslo area and also sabotage shipping. They succeeded in sinking the merchant vessel Sanev on 19 May 1943.

Background 
As preparation for an invasion in Scandinavia in 1944, SOE began to target industrial targets and coastal shipping in German occupied Norway. Norwegian resistance movements such as Milorg were working together with the British SOE against the Nazi occupation. Operations had already been conducted in Norway with the idea to hurt the German war machine. Fish oil factories that used gylcorel in explosives had already been targeted by the British as early as 1940 and other missions had been carried out to injure the German nuclear program and damage train lines.

The mission

Landing in Norway, contacting the Resistance 
Three SOE operatives from Company Liege; Tor Sternersen, Martin Olsen and wireless telegrapher Oddvar Sandersen dropped into Norway on 23 January 1943. They made contact with Milorg and set up 4 'X-groups', which were groups of six men trained in silent killing, especially the elimination of informers. These groups were organised by Milorg and trained by the Chaffinch operatives. The group also acted as a direct line of communication between Milorg and the U.K.

Ship sabotage 
The trio initially considered an attack on two destroyers stationed in Horten Harbour on 14 May. However they decided against the idea. Instead they targeted a ship docked at Moss. On 19 May 1943 a limpet mine was attached to the freighter Sanev while she was docked. The mine detonated the same day and the ship of nearly 2,000 tons sunk. A later attempt to attack shipping in the Oslo harbour was abandoned.

Aftermath 
All three men left Norway at the end of May 1943 and escaped to Sweden.

References

Citations

Bibliography

Conflicts in 1943
1943 in Norway
Acts of sabotage
Special Operations Executive operations